Empresas Municipales de Cali (informally: Emcali) is a state-owned company providing water, telecommunications, and electricity services in Cali, Colombia. In 2006 it had an income of 1.5 billion Colombian pesos. The General Manager is Fulvio Leonardo Soto.

References

Telecommunications companies of Colombia
Electric power companies of Colombia